There are two educational institutions named Kingsley College:

 Kingsley College, Melbourne, Australia
 Kingsley College, Redditch, United Kingdom